Frederick John Chapple (3 February 1884 – 1965) was an English professional footballer who played as an inside forward in the Football League for Aston Villa, Birmingham and Bristol City and in non-league football for Crewe Alexandra, Brentford and Blyth Spartans. He was Birmingham's top scorer in 1908–09, despite only joining the club halfway through the season.

Career statistics

References

1884 births
Footballers from Bristol
1965 deaths
English footballers
Association football inside forwards
Aston Villa F.C. players
Birmingham City F.C. players
Crewe Alexandra F.C. players
Brentford F.C. players
Bristol City F.C. players
Blyth Spartans A.F.C. players
English Football League players
Date of death missing
Association football wing halves